Tokhmarevo is a rural locality (a village) in Dvinitskoye Rural Settlement, Sokolsky District, Vologda Oblast, Russia. The population was 2 as of 2002.

Geography 
Tokhmarevo is located 53 km northeast of Sokol (the district's administrative centre) by road. Berkovo is the nearest rural locality.

References

Rural localities in Sokolsky District, Vologda Oblast